The Answer: Does Not Exist EP is the second EP created by the band The Ottoman Empire. It was released in March 2008. This was the last album by The Ottoman Empire before they changed their name to Luna Mortis.

Track listing

 "Fountain of Youth" - 4:15
 "Affliction" - 4:49
 "Anemic World V2" - 5:25
 "Dehumanized" - 4:17
 "Locked in Torment" - 4:03
 "Wrathshot V2" - 2:51

2008 EPs
Progressive metal EPs
Luna Mortis albums